Szokolya is a village in Pest county, Hungary.

Szokolya is a village of two thousand residents, situated in the largest basin of the Börzsöny Hills. The Morgó Brook runs across the village. The area is a popular destination for tourists as it can be easily reached by car from Budapest. It takes only 45–50 minutes to get there. Our village can be reached on the Eurovelo bicycle way, too. Szokolya has all infrastructure, most of our roads were renewed last year. Some local entrepreneurs started dynamic expansions to create competitive, attractive facilities for tourists and visitors.

The so-called wood train (little train running in the wood) offers new services, too.

The traditional Kacár farm offers handcraft activities, in the neighbouring Viski farm tourists can ride horses if they would like. In winter they can choose the renewed Nagyhideg-Hegy ski centre, where tourists can ski, sledge and hike.

In Királyrét, a nearby settlement in the woods, several hotels and restaurants can be found.

There is an exhibition room in which we commemorate the famous painters Mányoki Ádám and Viski János, who were born in Szokolya, and their works are here on display.

References

Populated places in Pest County